3,3′,5,5′-Tetramethylbenzidine or TMB is a chromogenic substrate used in staining procedures in immunohistochemistry as well as being a visualising reagent used in enzyme-linked immunosorbent assays (ELISA). TMB is a white solid that forms a pale blue-green liquid in solution with ethyl acetate. TMB is degraded by sunlight and by fluorescent lights.

Enzymatic assay

TMB can act as a hydrogen donor for the reduction of hydrogen peroxide to water by peroxidase enzymes such as horseradish peroxidase.

The resulting one-electron oxidation product is a diimine-diamine complex, which causes the solution to take on a blue colour, and this colour change can be read on a spectrophotometer at the wavelengths of 370 and 650 nm.

The reaction can be halted by addition of acid or another stop reagent. Using sulfuric acid turns TMB yellow, with a peak absorbance of 450 nm. The amount of converted TMB may be indexed by the amount of 450 nm light it absorbs.

Material Safety

TMB should be kept out of direct sunlight as it is photosensitive. It is not known if TMB is carcinogenic and the evidence is contradictory: TMB is not mutagenic by the Ames test, and did not induce formation of tumors in a single-arm study of 24 rats.  On that evidence, it has been used as a replacement for carcinogenic compounds such as benzidine and o-phenylenediamine.

References

Biphenyls
Anilines